From Bondage to Freedom is a 1911 Australian film starring the boxer Dave Smith.

It was described as "a great Australian drama with a stadium interest".

It is considered a lost film.

References

Australian silent short films
Lost Australian films
Australian black-and-white films
Australian drama films
1911 drama films
1911 films
1911 lost films
Lost drama films
1911 short films
Silent drama films